Halltown may refer to:

Halltown, Alabama, USA
Halltown, Missouri, USA
Halltown, West Virginia, USA

See also

 Town (disambiguation)
 Hall (disambiguation)
 
 Hal (disambiguation)
 Halle (disambiguation)
 Halton (disambiguation)
 Hallville (disambiguation)